Sudip is an Indian and Nepali masculine given name.

People with the name include:
 Sudip Bandyopadhyay (b. 1952), Indian politician
 Sudip Roy Barman, Indian politician
 Sudip Datta Bhaumik (d. 2017), Indian journalist
 Sudip Bose, American emergency physician
 Sudip Chatterjee, multiple people
 Sudip Chattopadhyay (b. 1960), Indian biologist
 Sudip Kumar Gharami (b. 1999), Indian cricketer
 Sudip Mazumder, computer engineer
 Sudip Kumar Mukherjee, Indian politician
 Sudip Roy, Indian artist
 Sudip Sharma, Indian screenwriter

See also 

Masculine given names
Nepalese masculine given names
Indian masculine given names